FK Veternik (Serbian Cyrillic: ФК Ветерник) is a football club based in Novi Sad, Vojvodina, Serbia.

History
The club was formed in 1977 along with the creation of Vujadin Boškov sports center. Until the 1990s the club mostly played in local lower leagues and the squad is formed mostly by local players. In the season 1997–98 the club reached for first time the 3rd league level, the Serbian League Vojvodina. In 2000 the club formed the football school where hundreds of young players begin their first steps in this sport. The club's school has participated in numerous tournaments in Serbia and in Europe.

In 2001 the club achieved its major sports achievement, the promotion to the Second League of FR Yugoslavia. Between 2001 and 2003 was also undertaken a major infrastructural development. Until nowadays numerous national and international players passed through the club, and the club officials feed the ambition to bring the club to compete in the top tiers.

Notable players
This is a list of club players with national team appearances:
 Milan Jovanić
 Aleksandar Sedlar
 Edward Acevedo Cruz
 Kerbi Rodríguez
 Predrag Bošnjak

References

External links
 Official club website
 Club profile and squad at Srbijafudbal.

Football clubs in Vojvodina
Football clubs in Novi Sad
Association football clubs established in 1977
1977 establishments in Serbia